Tavriisk is a town in Kakhovka Raion, Kherson Oblast, southern Ukraine, close to the city of Nova Kakhovka. It is located on the left bank of the Dnieper River. Tavriisk hosts the administration of the Tavriisk urban hromada, one of the hromadas of Ukraine.

Administrative status 
Until 18 July, 2020, Tavriisk belonged to Nova Kakhovka Municipality. The municipality as an administrative unit was abolished in July 2020 as part of the administrative reform of Ukraine, which reduced the number of raions of Kherson Oblast to five. The area of Nova Kakhovka Municipality was merged into Kakhovka Raion.

History 

In the Russian invasion of Ukraine, the Russian occupiers set up a mobile command post in the town. Unconfirmed reports said it was destroyed by HIMARS prior to 12 July, 2022. Major General Artem Nasbulin may have died in the attack.

See also
 Nova Kakhovka River Port
 North Crimean Canal

References 

Cities in Kherson Oblast
Cities of district significance in Ukraine
Populated places established in the Ukrainian Soviet Socialist Republic
Populated places on the Dnieper in Ukraine
Populated places of Kakhovka Reservoir
1983 establishments in Ukraine
Populated places established in 1983
Kakhovka Raion